GreenJolly (Gryndzholy) was a Ukrainian hip hop duo best known for their song "Razom nas bahato, nas ne podolaty", which became the unofficial anthem of the Ukrainian Orange Revolution in 2004.

History
GreenJolly consisted of Roman Kalyn and Roman Kostyuk, who originate from the Ivano-Frankivsk region of western Ukraine. In conjunction with various Ukrainian radio stations, the band wrote the song "Razom nas bahato, nas ne podolaty" to support the protests against electoral fraud that took place during the 2004 Ukrainian presidential election.

The song became widely known in Ukraine and was frequently played on radio and TV stations. GreenJolly won the nomination to represent Ukraine in the Eurovision Song Contest 2005 after "Razom nas bahato" was controversially inserted as a last-minute "wildcard" addition to the final of the national pre-selection competition. However, the song's lyrics had to be substantially reworked in order to be consistent with European Broadcasting Union rules.

In the finals, which were held in Ukraine after Ruslana's win in the 2004 contest, GreenJolly finished twentieth.

Since their Eurovision appearance, the band has fallen apart, with both members focusing on their respective music production studios.

References

Ukrainian musical groups
Eurovision Song Contest entrants for Ukraine
Eurovision Song Contest entrants of 2005